Abingdon was a municipal borough embracing the town of Abingdon-on-Thames in the county of Berkshire from 1835 to 1974. From 1894 it was nearly entirely surrounded by Abingdon Rural District. It was abolished in 1974 under the Local Government Act 1972, and merged with other districts to form the new Vale of White Horse district of Oxfordshire.

References
Vision of Britain

Municipal Borough
Districts of England abolished by the Local Government Act 1972
Former districts of Berkshire
Municipal boroughs of England
1835 establishments in England